Al-Fao is a self-propelled artillery system designed for the former Iraqi Army by the late Canadian weapons engineer, Gerald Bull.
Its gun is claimed to be able to fire four  rounds a minute. The projectiles could be filled with chemical weapons such as sarin, mustard gas or phosgene, or with conventional high explosives.

The weapon is named after the Al-Faw peninsula in southern Iraq, which was the scene of heavy fighting during the Iran–Iraq War in the 1980s. (The difference in spelling is due to differing transliterations of the Arabic name.)

The Al-Fao was designed and built in Europe. It was similar in design to the South African G6 howitzer, with which Bull was also involved as a designer, and appears to have been directly inspired by that system.

See also
 List of artillery

References 

210 mm artillery
Wheeled self-propelled howitzers
Artillery of Iraq